Whitney may refer to:

Film and television 
 Whitney (2015 film), a Whitney Houston biopic starring Yaya DaCosta
 Whitney (2018 film), a documentary about Whitney Houston
 Whitney (TV series), an American sitcom that premiered in 2011

Firearms
Whitney Wolverine, a semi-automatic, .22 LR caliber pistol 
Whitney revolver, a gun carried by Powell when he attempted to assassinate Secretary of State William Seward

Music 
 Whitney Houston, sometimes eponymously known as 'Whitney'
 Whitney (album), an album by Whitney Houston
 Whitney (band), an American rock band

Places

Canada
 Whitney, Ontario

United Kingdom
 Witney, Oxfordshire
 Witney (UK Parliament constituency), a constituency for the House of Commons
 Whitney-on-Wye, Herefordshire

United States
 Whitney, Alabama
 Whitney, California, a community in Placer County
 Whitney, California, former name of Lone Pine Station, California
 Whitney, Idaho
 Whitney, Maine
 Whitney, Michigan
 Whitney Township, Michigan
 Whitney, Nebraska
 Whitney, Nevada
 Whitney Point, New York
 Whitney, Oregon
 Whitney, South Carolina
 Whitney, Texas
 Whitney, Washington
 Whitney, West Virginia

Organizations 
 Whitney (City Road, London), a shop founded in 1875
 Whitney Museum of American Art, a museum in New York City
 Hancock Bank or Whitney Bank

Schools
 Whitney High School (Cerritos, California)
 Whitney High School (Rocklin, California)
 Whitney Humanities Center, an interdisciplinary institution at Yale University

Other uses 
 Whitney (surname)
 Whitney (given name)
 Whitney (typeface)
 Mount Whitney, the highest peak in the contiguous United States
 Whitney Awards, awards for achievement in Mormon fiction
 Whitney Biennial, a biennial art exhibition
 Whitney South Sea Expedition, a 1920–1932 scientific expedition to the South Pacific
 Whitney (Pokémon), a character in the Pokémon series
 Whitney, a character from Barney & Friends

See also
 David Whitney Building, skyscraper in Detroit, Michigan
 David Whitney House, historic residence in Detroit, Michigan
 J.H. Whitney & Company, a venture capital firm in the U.S.
 Pratt & Whitney, an aircraft engine maker
 Whitney & Company (Leominster, Massachusetts)
 Whitney umbrella, in mathematics
 Whitney v. California 274 U.S. 357 (1927), U.S. Supreme Court decision upholding the conviction of a Communist Labor Party official